Andrew Oyombe (born 24 February 1985) is a Kenyan footballer. He played in 13 matches for the Kenya national football team from 2004 to 2008. He was also named in Kenya's squad for the 2004 African Cup of Nations tournament.

Oyombe moved to Sweden in 2004 after being given an opportunity by second-tier side Enköpings. He went back to Kenya after a few years only to return to Sweden as a political refugee in 2010, subsequently joining Skärhamns while awaiting a ruling on his asylum.

References

External links
 

1985 births
Living people
Footballers from Nairobi
Kenyan footballers
Association football defenders
Tusker F.C. players
Enköpings SK players
Gor Mahia F.C. players
Mathare United F.C. players
Sofapaka F.C. players
Kenyan Premier League players
Superettan players
Division 2 (Swedish football) players
Division 3 (Swedish football) players
Kenya international footballers
2004 African Cup of Nations players
Kenyan expatriate footballers
Kenyan expatriate sportspeople in Sweden
Expatriate footballers in Sweden